The 1994–95 WHL season was the 29th season for the Western Hockey League.  Sixteen teams completed a 72-game season.  The Kamloops Blazers won their third President's Cup in four seasons, as well as their third Memorial Cup in four seasons.

League notes
The Victoria Cougars relocated to Prince George, British Columbia to become the Prince George Cougars.

Regular season

Final standings

Scoring leaders
Note: GP = Games played; G = Goals; A = Assists; Pts = Points; PIM = Penalties in minutes

1995 WHL Playoffs
In the West Division, 2 groups of 3 teams played a round robin of 4 games to determine who would advance to the Division Semi-Finals. In group A, Kamloops (3-1) and Portland (3-1) advanced while Seattle (0-4) was eliminated. In group B, Spokane (3-1) and Tri-City (2-2) advanced while Tacoma (1-3) was eliminated.

All-Star game

On January 31, A combined WHL/QMJHL all-star team defeated the OHL all-stars 8–3 at Kitchener, Ontario before a crowd of 5,679.

WHL awards

All-Star Teams

See also
1995 Memorial Cup
1995 NHL Entry Draft
1994 in sports
1995 in sports

References
whl.ca
 2005–06 WHL Guide

Western Hockey League seasons
WHL
WHL